DJ-Kicks: Nicolette is a DJ mix album, mixed by Nicolette. It was released on  10 March 1997 on the Studio !K7 independent record label as part of the DJ-Kicks series.

CD Cat number: !K7054CD
Vinyl Cat number: !K7054LP

Disc one
"It's Yours" - Doc Scott  – 5:00 
"Never Not" (The Black Dog remix) - Nav Katze  – 5:56 
"Nightbreed" - C. J. Bolland  – 5:00
"Java Bass" - Shut Up and Dance  – 3:17 
"Suicide" - Alec Empire  – 4:08 
"Migrant" - Palace of Pleasure  – 6:46 
"Phyzical" - Roni Size  – 6:09 
"Ventolin" (Salbutamol Mix) - Aphex Twin  – 6:08 
"Pound Your Ironing Board" - The Mike Flowers Pops & Slang  – 3:09 
"I Woke Up" - Nicolette  – 5:46 
"Lash the 90's" - Alec Empire  – 4:34 
"Original Nuttah" - Shy FX & UK Apache  – 2:17 
"Severe Tramua" - Critical Mass  – 2:10

Disc two
"Burning" - DJ Krust  – 7:46 
"Pillow" - Ohm Square  – 4:44 
"70 + DF" - Horn  – 6:37 
"Basslines Playin' Loud" - Tag  – 2:29 
"A Single Ring" - Nicolette  – 2:23 
"Sweat" - Shizuo  – 4:06 
"Bastards" - Shut Up and Dance  – 5:36 
"Too Busy to Live" (Pressure Mix) - Oge  – 3:51 
"You, Them and Maybe Us" (Challenge Sonica Mix) - Grammatix  – 4:41 
"Angry Dolphin" - Plaid  – 6:04 
"Walhalla's Gate" - Aquastep  – 5:24 
"Bless to Kill" - Mark N-R-G  – 3:46 
"All Day (DJ Kicks)" - Nicolette  – 4:36

External links 
DJ-Kicks website

Nicolette
Nicolette (musician) albums
1997 compilation albums